Eugenio María de Hostos Community College of The City University of New York is a public community college in the South Bronx, New York City. It is part of the City University of New York (CUNY) system and was created by an act of the Board of Higher Education in 1968 in response to demands from the Hispanic/Puerto Rican community, which was urging for the establishment of a college to serve the people of the South Bronx. In 1970, the college admitted its first class of 623 students at the site of a former tire factory. Several years later, the college moved to a larger site nearby at 149th Street and Grand Concourse. The college also operates a location at the prow building of the Bronx Terminal Market.

Academics 
Hostos is the first institution of higher education on the mainland to be named after a Puerto Rican, Eugenio María de Hostos, an educator, writer, and patriot. A large proportion (approximately 60 percent) of the student population is Hispanic, thus many of the courses at Hostos are offered in Spanish, and the college also provides extensive English and ESL instruction to students.

The Hostos Center for the Arts & Culture is a performing arts center contained within the college campus. It consists of a museum-grade art gallery, a 367-seat Repertory Theater, and a 900-seat Main Theater, presenting artists of national and international renown. It has been showcasing theater, dance and music artists for 33 years, with the mission "to be a cultural force in the Bronx and throughout the New York metropolitan area."

Departments and academic programs 
The college is composed of 10 different academic departments offering 27 associate-level degrees. Hostos is notable for being the first and only CUNY campus offering a degree in Game Design. The campus also features a $1.05 million-dollar live recording studio, which is used by the media design programs.

 Allied Health
 Behavioral and Social Sciences
 Business
 Education
 English
 Humanities
 Language & Cognition
 Library
 Mathematics
 Natural Sciences

Student profile

Total student enrollment at Hostos in Fall 2018 was 7,340 predominantly full-time students. Around 67% of the student population is female and about 33% male, with an average student age of 25 years old.

Athletics 
Hostos Community College teams participate as a member of the National Junior College Athletic Association (NJCAA). The Caimans are a member of the community college section of the City University of New York Athletic Conference (CUNYAC), who's the most recent new member since the 2002-03 season. Men's sports include basketball and soccer; while women's sports include basketball and volleyball. In 2020, Hostos Athletics announced their entry into the Esports league of the NJCAA starting with the 2020-2021 season.

Early College Program 
Hostos Community College is affiliated with Hostos Lincoln Academy of Science, a middle school and high school with an early college program as part of the Early College Initiative at CUNY. It serves students grades 6 to 12, along with special education services. The school is a collaboration between the New York City Department of Education and City University of New York. High school students at the school enter the program during the summer prior to the start their tenth grade year and can earn up to 60 credits in order to graduate with a high school diploma and associates degree. The school was originally located on campus, but was moved to a school building near Melrose, which is shared by a few other schools, due to spacing issues.

Notable faculty 
 Laura Andel – musician, conductor and composer
 Humberto Ballesteros Capasso – Colombian writer
Michael Cisco – novelist and translator
 Daisy Cocco De Filippis – author and the eighth President of Eugenio María de Hostos Community College. Former president of Naugatuck Valley Community College
 Mildred García – current president of the American Association of State Colleges and Universities (AASCU)
 Isaac Goldemberg – Peruvian-American author
 Andrew Huebner – novelist
 Cynthia Jones – Recognized in 2014 as the New York State Professor of the Year by the Carnegie Foundation for the Advancement of Teaching and the Council for Advancement and Support of Education.
 Felix V. Matos Rodriguez – eighth Chancellor of The City University of New York (CUNY)
 Michael Mbabuike – Nigerian poet and linguist
 Sol Miranda – Puerto Rican actress
 Juno Morrow – artist and designer
 Arthur Nersesian – novelist, playwright and Anahid Literary Prize winner
 William S. Penn – Native American writer and American Book Award for Literary Merit winner
 Graciela Rivera – first Puerto Rican to sing a lead role at the Metropolitan Opera 
 Rees Shad – Recognized in 2012 as the New York State Professor of the Year by the Carnegie Foundation for the Advancement of Teaching and the Council for Advancement and Support of Education.
 Jorge Silva Puras – United States Small Business Administration Regional Administrator and Chief of Staff to the Governor of Puerto Rico
 Debra Solomon – animator, filmmaker and creator of Disney's Lizzie McGuire
 Barbara Summers – writer and fashion model
 Edgardo Vega Yunqué – novelist

References

External links 
 Official website
 Official athletics website

 
Two-year colleges in the United States
Colleges of the City University of New York
Educational institutions established in 1970
Universities and colleges in the Bronx
Community colleges in New York City
1970 establishments in New York City
NJCAA athletics
Mott Haven, Bronx